
Jose Garcia or José García may refer to:

Sports

Association football
 José García (Uruguayan footballer) (1926–2011)
 José García Quesada (1931–2013), Chilean footballer
 José García Castro (1933–2003), known as Pepillo, Spanish footballer
 José María García-Aranda (born 1956), Spanish football referee
 José Enrique García (born 1967), Uruguayan footballer
 José Mari García (born 1971), Spanish football midfielder
 José Daniel García (born 1985), Mexican football defender
 José García (footballer, born 1996) (born 1996), Mexican football defender
 José García (footballer, born 1997), Spanish football midfielder
 José García (Honduran footballer) (born 1998)

Baseball
 José García (pitcher, born 1981), Cuban baseball pitcher
 José García (pitcher, born 1985), Dominican baseball pitcher
 José García (shortstop) (born 1998), Cuban baseball shortstop

Other sportspeople
 José García (boxer) (born 1968), Venezuelan boxer
 José Garcia (canoeist) (born 1964), Portuguese sprint canoer
 José García (field hockey) (born 1952), Spanish hockey player
 José García (runner) (born 1946), Mexican Olympic runner
 José García (weightlifter) (born 1960), Ecuadorian Olympic weightlifter
 José Amado García (born 1977), Guatemalan long-distance runner
 José Manuel García (runner) (born 1966), retired Spanish long-distance runner
 José Vicente García (born 1972), Spanish professional road bicycle racer

Government, politics and law
 José García de León y Pizarro (1770–1835), Spanish politician
 José Manuel García Bedoya (fl. 1930s), Peruvian politician
 José Antonio García Belaúnde (born 1948), Peruvian diplomat and politician
 José Andreu García (1937–2019), American Puerto Rican jurist
 José García Hernández (1915–2000), Spanish politician and journalist 
 José García Ladrón de Guevara, Spanish politician and journalist

Arts and entertainment
 José García Villa (1908–1997), Filipino writer
 José García Nieto (1914–2001), Spanish poet
 José Ros García (1920–2001), Spanish-born poet who lived and worked for part of his life in Australia
 José García Román (born 1945), Spanish composer
 José Luis García-López (born 1948), Spanish comic-book artist
 José Garcia (actor) (born 1966), French-Spanish actor
 Jose Garcia (game designer), founder of Daedalus Entertainment
 José C. Garcia de Letona, Mexican producer and co-founder of Ánima Estudios

Other
 José García González (1938–2020), Spanish psychiatrist and neurologist 
 José Guillermo García (born 1933), Salvadoran soldier
 José Juan García (1940–2002), founder of the international institution Hogares Crea

See also
 José Luis García (disambiguation)
 José Antonio García (disambiguation)